Thomas Alexander Walker (born 17 December 1991) is a British singer-songwriter. He was trained at the stage school London College of Creative Media, and was given a contract soon after. He rose to fame after the release of his single "Leave a Light On", which peaked at number 7 on the UK Singles Chart in June 2018.

Early life
Walker was born in Kilsyth, near Glasgow, but at the age of three his family moved to the Cheshire town of Chelford. He described his upbringing as being in a 'Glaswegian house' as his parents were Glaswegian sounding. He speaks with a Scottish accent when with family or in Scotland. His favourite artists while growing up included Ray Charles, Muddy Waters and Paolo Nutini.

Career
In 2014, prior to fame, Walker graduated from London College of Creative Media.

2017–2019: What a Time to Be Alive and collaborations
In 2017, Walker released "Just You and I", which was picked as Elvis Duran's Artist of the Month appearing on NBC's Today show with Kathie Lee Gifford where he performed the song. His follow-up single was "Blessings", the title track from his debut EP Blessings. On 13 June 2017, Walker released the single "Heartland", which was co-written and produced by Naughty Boy. On 22 August 2017, the single was added to the BBC Radio 1 playlist. Later in 2017, Walker was named as one of the new additions to the BBC Radio 1 Brit List. Walker has played support slots for artists such as George Ezra, Gallant and Jake Bugg. On 28 September, Walker began his US tour, in Connecticut, supporting The Script.

On 13 October 2017, Walker released his single "Leave a Light On" on Relentless Records. The single was co-written and produced by Steve Mac. The music video for "Leave a Light On" was produced by Charles Mehling, and filmed in Croatia. It impacted numerous international charts and was included in his debut studio album What a Time to Be Alive. In 2019, Walker won the Best Breakthrough Act at the 2019 Brit Awards. His song "Leave the Light On" was also nominated for "Best British Single".

2020–present: Second studio album
In November 2019, Walker confirmed he had begun working on his second studio album. Following this, in early 2020, What a Time to Be Alive achieved platinum accreditation by the British Phonographic Industry for sales of over 300,000 units in the UK.

As part of "Royal Carols: Together at Christmas", Tom Walker performed "For Those Who Can't Be Here" with Catherine, Duchess of Cambridge playing piano.

Personal life
Walker is a supporter of football club Manchester United F.C.

Discography

Studio albums

Extended plays

Singles

As lead artist

As featured artist

Guest appearances

Songwriting credits

Notes

References

External links
Official website

1991 births
Living people
Scottish male singer-songwriters
People from Knutsford
People from Kilsyth
Relentless Records artists
21st-century Scottish singers
21st-century British male singers